Kabbia is one of four departments in Mandoul, a region of Chad. Its capital is Gounou Gaya.

Departments of Chad
Mayo-Kebbi Est Region